Lalmatia is a village in the Boarijore CD block in the Godda subdivision of the Godda district in the Indian state of Jharkhand.

Geography

Location                                            

Overview
Rajmahal coalfield is shown in the map. The entire area is overwhelmingly rural with only small pockets of urbanisation.

Note: The full screen map is interesting. All places marked on the map are linked and you can easily move on to another page of your choice. Enlarge the map to see what else is there – one gets railway links, many more road links and so on.

Demographics
According to the 2011 Census of India, Lalmatia had a total population of 1,208, of which 720 (60%) were males and 488 (40%) were females. Population in the age range 0–6 years was 183. The total number of literate persons in Lalmatia was 786 (76.68% of the population over 6 years).

Civic administration

Police station
Lalmatia police station serves Boarijore CD block.

Economy
A major coal mining project of Eastern Coalfields Limited (Rajmahal open cast project, a part of Rajmahal coalfield) is going on in Boarijore, Mahagama and Sunderpahari CD blocks. Please see the satellite view of the Google map.

Education
Jawahar Navodaya Vidyalaya Lalmatia is a Hindi-medium coeducational institution established in 1987. It has facilities for teaching from class VI to class XII.

Adwasi Inter College, Lalmatia is a Hindi-medium coeducation institution established in 1985. It has facilities for teaching in classes XI and XII.

Government High School Lalmatia is a Hindi-medium coeducational institution established in 1961. It has facilities for teaching in classes IX and X.

References

Villages in Godda district
Mining communities in Jharkhand